Taullicocha or Tawlliqucha (Quechua tawlli a kind of legume (a lupinus species), qucha lake, "tawlli lake", also spelled Taullicocha, Taulliqocha) is a lake in the Cordillera Blanca in the Andes of Peru located in the Ancash Region, Huaylas Province, Santa Cruz District. Taullicocha lies southeast of Pucajirca and southwest of Taulliraju.

The Santa Cruz (Quechua for "white river") originates near Taullicocha. It is a right tributary of the Santa River.

References 

Lakes of Peru
Lakes of Ancash Region